Verkhnyaya Staritsa is a rural locality (a settlement) and the administrative center of Verkhnestaritskoye Rural Settlement, Gaynsky District, Perm Krai, Russia. The population was 822 as of 2010. There are 13 streets.

Geography 
Verkhnyaya Staritsa is located 26 km southeast of Gayny (the district's administrative centre) by road. Kasimovka is the nearest rural locality.

References 

Rural localities in Gaynsky District